James R. Molinari (born December 26, 1954) is an American basketball coach and lawyer. Molinari was most recently an assistant coach at Oklahoma from 2019 to 2021. He formerly served as an assistant coach at Nebraska and as former head coach of the Western Illinois University Leathernecks, where he served from 2008 to 2014.  Prior to being named coach at WIU, Molinari was as assistant coach at Ball State University after serving as the interim head coach at the University of Minnesota, replacing Dan Monson on November 30, 2006 and being succeeded by Tubby Smith on March 22, 2007.  Previously, he served as head men's basketball coach at Northern Illinois University and Bradley University. He also was a scout for the Toronto Raptors and Miami Heat.

Molinari graduated from Glenbard West High School, where he starred on its varsity boys' basketball team. He first attended Kansas State University from 1973 to 1975, lettering twice with Jack Hartman's Wildcats. A 6'1" (1.85 meters) guard who wore uniform number 30, he appeared in 22 games, including a 95–87 defeat to Syracuse in the NCAA East Regional Final at the Providence Civic Center on March 22, 1975. He transferred to Illinois Wesleyan University for his last two undergraduate years. A reserve who averaged 9.1 points per game, he was a teammate of Jack Sikma in both seasons. He earned a Bachelor of Arts in English in 1977.

Molinari graduated from the DePaul University College of Law, earning his juris doctor in 1980. He passed the Bar Exam. Molinari spent eleven seasons as an assistant coach for both Ray and Joey Meyer at DePaul University. 

His first head coaching assignment began on April 28, 1989 when he replaced Jim Rosborough at Northern Illinois University (NIU). A combined 42–17 in his two seasons at NIU, the Huskies finished the 1990–91 campaign with the second-best team defense in the nation which allowed 57.5 points a game, a program-best 25–6 record and an at-large bid to the NCAA Division I men's basketball tournament.

He succeeded Stan Albeck in a similar capacity at Bradley University on April 12, 1991. He inherited a program which had at least 20 losses in each of the previous two years. After going a combined 18–39 in Molinari's first two seasons at Bradley, the Braves had at least 20 wins in each of the three subsequent years. His most successful campaign was 1995–96 when he was named the Missouri Valley Conference (MVC) Coach of the Year and the Braves earned an at-large bid to the NCAA tournament. He had a 174–152 record in eleven seasons at Bradley which also included five National Invitation Tournament (NIT) appearances in 1994, 1995, 1997, 1999 and 2001. Despite having the longest tenure among MVC men's basketball head coaches at the time, he was fired on March 5, 2002 after a 9–20 finish. The dismissal was driven by David Broski's dissatisfaction over the Braves' 42–48 record during the three years he had been university president at that point. Molinari was replaced by Jim Les a month later on April 7.

Molinari and his ex-wife Carol are the parents of four children. Two went on to play college basketball. Billy played at Western Illinois University under Molinari. David played one year at Illinois Wesleyan University and walked onto DePaul for the 2014–2015 season.

Head coaching record

Notes

References

1954 births
Living people
Ball State Cardinals men's basketball coaches
Bradley Braves men's basketball coaches
College men's basketball head coaches in the United States
Illinois Wesleyan Titans men's basketball players
Kansas State Wildcats men's basketball players
Minnesota Golden Gophers men's basketball coaches
Northern Illinois Huskies men's basketball coaches
Nebraska Cornhuskers men's basketball coaches
Point guards
Western Illinois Leathernecks men's basketball coaches
American men's basketball players